is a Japanese singer, songwriter and model from Fukuoka. He was previously a member of the funk band Modio and signed with Miya Terrace in 2017 as a solo artist, releasing his debut studio album, Blue. Mukai has collaborated with a range of artists including Sik-K, Jevon, M-Flo, and Minmi.

Music career 

In 2010, Mukai moved to Tokyo from his hometown, Fukuoka to pursue his musical career as a singer. He started singing as a member of a funk band, Modio. In November 2011, he withdrew from the band and determined to start his career as a solo singer.

Mukai released his song "Kimi ni Kiss shite" on 22 October, on SoundCloud. The song was well-received online and he continued to post some songs of his.
 
On 7 June 2015, he started to write a blog on the website of one of the most famous Japanese men's fashion magazine, Men's Fudge.

On 30 March 2016, he released his first EP Pool, which features six songs he had posted on his SoundCloud page.

On 26 October 2016, he released "Slow Down" as the lead single from his second EP 24. The song is known for sampling Jeremih's "Oui".

On 19 November 2016, he released his second EP 24.

In July 2017, he announced that he'd perform at the Summer Sonic Festival 2017.

Discography

Albums

Studio albums

Live albums

Extended plays

Singles

As lead artist

As featured artist

Promotional singles

Other appearance

References

External links 

  
  at label Toy's Factory 

21st-century Japanese singers
21st-century Japanese male singers
1992 births
Japanese male pop singers
Japanese pop musicians
Japanese songwriters
Japanese-language singers
Living people
Models from Fukuoka Prefecture
Musicians from Fukuoka Prefecture
People from Fukuoka